An on-us check is a negotiable item (check) which is drawn on the same bank that it is presented to for payment.

For example, a check drawn on Bank of America, presented for deposit at another branch of Bank of America, would be considered an on-us check. The same item presented for deposit at Wells Fargo Bank would be considered a transit check. Routing numbers, as well as the bank name printed on the check, help to determine an item's classification.

References

See also 
 Transit check
 Clearing
 Clearing house
 Routing number

Cheques